Kuyteav is a Cambodian noodle soup consisting of rice noodles with pork stock and toppings. A popular breakfast dish in Cambodia, kuyteav can be found at marketplace stalls, roadside vendors, restaurants and in shophouses across the country, and is distinguished by its clear broth and array of herbs, aromatics and other garnishes and condiments.

Etymology
The word kuyteav derives from the Teochew Chinese word  (peng'im: guê2diao5) and refers to cut noodles made from long-grain rice flour (as opposed to glutinous rice flour). This term also refers to the dish: a rice noodle soup with minced meat and various other toppings and seasonings. The term has cognates in Southeast Asia with hủ tiếu in Vietnamese, kway teow in Malaysia and Singapore, and kuai tiao in Thai being analogues.

Preparation

Kuyteav is prepared with partially dry thin squarish rice noodles cooked by quickly immersing the noodles in boiling water. The noodles are then strained, placed into a bowl, and moistened with nutty, caramelised garlic oil. After dressing with a sticky brown liquid made of oyster sauce, soy sauce and a pinch of sugar, the bowl is then filled with a clear broth made from pork bones, dried squid, and sugar, and seasoned with a bit of fish sauce. Then the meat toppings are added, which may include an assembly of different types of meat, such as pork loaf, minced pork, pork belly, duck, seafood or offal. Availability is the main factor in what toppings are used in kuyteav; some versions can be quite humble and basic, using only some ground pork and perhaps some dried shrimp for protein, while others can be more time-consuming and extravagant. Finally, when the dish is presented at the table, the diner may add a number of garnishes and aromatics to customise the dish in accordance with his or her preferences.

Moreover, kuyteav may be presented in one of two ways: with all the ingredients in the soup, or with the soup on the side. Both versions can have exactly the same ingredients but allow the diner to control the balance of flavours, spiciness and textures. When the dish is served this way (“dry” as opposed to “wet”) the dish takes on the appearance of a noodle salad. Finally, the Phnom Penh version of kuyteav is the most extravagant and features the most embellishments, owing to the city's historical wealth and importance. Kuyteav Phnom Penh may contain some or all of the following toppings: sliced pork belly, ground pork, pig's blood jelly, chopped pork offal (such as intestine, heart, liver and lung), roast duck, Mekong River prawns, sliced fish cake and squid.

Consumption and culture

In Cambodia, kuyteav is still primarily a breakfast dish, and will typically be sold out by vendors before midday. As the pork broth is intended to be subtle rather than spicy, a plethora of optional herbs and other aromatics are always presented, allowing the diner to adjust the textures and flavours of the dish to their liking. In fact, in Cambodia, it is precisely the use of garnishes and condiments that defines the main flavour profile of the dish (garlic, limes and pepper are a common flavour trio in Cambodian cuisine), rather than the broth. The dish is served with garnishes that can include lettuce leaves, bean sprouts, fresh herbs (such as spring onions (scallions), sawtooth coriander and holy basil), crushed black kampot pepper, lime juice, and caramelised garlic oil. Many types of chilli (fresh, dried, pickled) and chilli sauce are also normally present at the table, to either add into the broth or to be used as a dipping sauce for the meat toppings, as well as soy sauce, fish sauce and sugar. Kuyteav is also sometimes eaten with deep-fried breadsticks, similar to how the Cambodians would eat congee.

See also
 Hủ tiếu
 Kway teow
 Kuai tiao
 Kyay oh

References

   Cambodia: Daily life and social customs. Britannica Online Encyclopedia. Rpt. in Cambodia. N.p.: n.p., n.d. N. pag. Encyclopædia Britannica Online. Web. 15 May 2010.

External links 
 Iris Ni. Feels like home: Cambodian noodle soup tells this family's story. 29 January 2021. SBS.
 Nite Yun. Kuy Teav Phnom Penh (Cambodian Noodle Soup). Salt+Spine. Episode 71.
 Deana Saukam. Cambodian Rice Noodle Soup. March 2018. Food & Wine.

Cambodian soups
Noodle soups